State court may refer to:

Courts of constituent states of English-speaking federated states

State court (United States)
Judiciary of Australia#State and territory courts

Courts of English-speaking unitary states
 State Courts of Singapore

Non-English names that may be translated as "state court"

Landesgericht (Germany)
Judiciary of Brazil#State-level judiciary

See also 

Provincial court